Salas ('Islands' in Latvian) is a neighbourhood of Riga, the capital of Latvia. Its landmass consists entirely of the islands Zaķusala, Lucavsala, and Kazas sēklis ('Goat Sandbank'). It is the least populated neighbourhood of Riga with a population of just around 70-80 people.

Gallery 

Neighbourhoods in Riga